Acacia subporosa, also commonly known as river wattle, bower wattle, narrow-leaf bower wattle and sticky bower wattle,<ref name=www>{{cite web|url=http://worldwidewattle.com/speciesgallery/subporosa.php|title=Acacia subporosa'''|accessdate=14 January 2021|publisher=Western Australian Herbarium}}</ref> is a tree or shrub of the genus Acacia and the subgenus Plurinerves that is endemic to an area of south eastern Australia. It is considered to be rare in Victoria

Description
It has sticky and glabrous branchlets that have green to brown alternating ridges. Like most species of Acacia it has phyllodes rather than true leaves. It blooms between July and October and occasionally into the summertime producing pale yellow flowers. The simple inflorescences occur singly or in groups of up to three in the axils and have spherical flower-heads with a diameter of  containing 20 to 25 flowers.

Taxonomy
The species was first formally described by the botanist Ferdinand von Mueller in 1863 as a part of the work Fragmenta Phytographiae Australiae , the initial spelling was Acacia supporosa. It was reclassified as Racosperma subporosum by Leslie Pedley in 2003 then transferred back to genus Acacia in 2006. The type specimen was collected by von Mueller from Twofold bay in New South Wales.
The specific epithet is derived from the small oil glands on the phyllodes. The species is closely related to Acacia cognata and both belong to the Acacia verniciflua complex.

Distribution
It is native to coastal areas of south eastern New South Wales and north western Victoria. The range of the plant extends from around Bega in the north to around Howe Hill on the north eastern tip of the Victoria-New South Wales border in the south in the far east Gippsland area. It is commonly situated along creeks and streams in gullies or on low hillsides found near the margins of rainforest communities growing in moist sandy or shale-based soils and conglomerates. It is often associated with Acacia longifolia''.

Cultivation
The plant is susceptible to root rot and shothole borer.

See also
List of Acacia species

References

subporosa
Taxa named by Ferdinand von Mueller
Flora of New South Wales
Flora of Victoria (Australia)
Plants described in 1863